Souls of Mischief is a hip hop group from Oakland, California, that is also part of the hip hop collective Hieroglyphics. The Souls of Mischief formed in 1991 and is composed of rappers A-Plus, Opio, Phesto, and Tajai.

History
East Oakland native Tajai began rhyming with future bandmate A-Plus at age 8, while both were in elementary school. Tajai and Phesto met later in junior high school. Tajai recruited his best friend Phesto in middle school and A-Plus brought Opio into the budding act in high school before making its major-label debut on Jive Records with the group's well-received album 93 'til Infinity, in 1993.

The group is part of the hip-hop collective Hieroglyphics, along with emcees Del tha Funkee Homosapien, Casual, Pep Love, Jaybiz, and producer Domino. The group participated as full members in all three of Hieroglyphics' studio albums: 1998's 3rd Eye Vision, 2003's Full Circle, and 2013's The Kitchen.

93 ’til Infinity is the group's highest charting album to date (#17 Top R&B/Hip Hop Albums; #85 Billboard 200) and, in January, 1998, was named one of the Top 100 Rap albums by The Source magazine.

The group stayed with Jive for one more album, 1995's No Man's Land, before being released from the label during the same year.

The group released two albums on Hiero's self-owned independent label, Hieroglyphics Imperium Recordings: 1999's Focus, and 2000's Trilogy: Conflict, Climax, Resolution.

On October 30, 2006, Hierocast (Hieroglyphics' official podcast), Del tha Funkee Homosapien reported that the Souls of Mischief was currently working on its next studio album with Prince Paul (De La Soul, Gravediggaz, Handsome Boy Modeling School).

On January 6, 2009, Souls of Mischief released the Tour Stories EP produced by Domino and co-produced by Prince Paul. The song is taken from the group's fifth studio album, Montezuma's Revenge, released on Hieroglyphics Imperium.

In 2013, a documentary about the band was released entitled Til Infinity: The Souls of Mischief. Produced and directed by Shomari Smith, it reflected on the 20-year anniversary of the band's debut album 93 'Til Infinity and includes over 50 interviews with prominent MCs, DJs, and producers of the era.

During the 2017 NBA Playoffs, Gatorade released a television commercial promoting Gatorade Flow, which featured Indiana Pacers star forward Paul George and the instrumental music of Souls of Mischief' 93 'Til Infinity.

Discography

Studio albums

Singles

Notes

References

External links
 [ Allmusic Biography]
 Discogs.com Profile
 Hieroglyphics.com Official Site

Hip hop groups from California
Alternative hip hop groups
Musical groups established in 1993
Jive Records artists
Musical groups from Oakland, California